HD 164604 is a single star in the southern constellation of Sagittarius constellation. It has the proper name Pincoya, as selected in the NameExoWorlds campaign by Chile, during the 100th anniversary of the IAU. Pincoya is a female water spirit from southern Chilean mythology who is said to bring drowned sailors to the Caleuche so that they can live in the afterlife. A 2015 survey ruled out the existence of any additional stellar companions at projected distances from 13 to 340 astronomical units. It is known to host a single super-Jupiter exoplanet.

This star is invisible to the naked eye with an apparent visual magnitude of 9.62. It is located at a distance of 128.5 light years from the Sun based on parallax, and is drifting further away with a radial velocity of +6 km/s. The stellar classification of HD 164604 is K3.5V(k), which indicates this is a K-type main-sequence star. The chromosphere is considered very inactive. It is roughly seven billion years old with 77% of the mass and radius of the Sun. The star is radiating 26% of the luminosity of the Sun from its photosphere at an effective temperature of 4,684 K.

Planetary system
A single super-Jupiter exoplanet was detected by the Magellan Planet Search Program in 2010 based on radial velocity variations of the host star. The orbit of this body does not preclude a hypothetical Earth-mass exoplanet from occupying a dynamically stable orbit within the habitable zone of this star. An astrometric measurement of the planet's inclination and true mass was published in 2022 as part of Gaia DR3.

References 

K-type main-sequence stars
Planetary systems with one confirmed planet
Sagittarius (constellation)
CD-28 14058
164604
088414